Milana Kamilkhanovna Dadasheva (born 20 February 1995 in Dagestan) is Russian freestyle wrestler of Kumyk descent, senior Russian national champion 2016 and 2022, two time Junior world championships bronze medalist. She competed at the 2016 Olympics in the Women's freestyle 48 kg, Dadasheva beat Kim Hyon-gyong of North Korea in the qualification, but she was eliminated by the eventual bronze medalist Elitsa Yankova of Bulgaria in the round of 16. 2018 U23 World Championships runner-up at 53 kilos.

Other awards and honors
International Freestyle:
 Klippan Lady Open; 3rd - 49 kg.
 Junior European Championships 2012, 2015; 3rd - 48 kg.
 Junior World Championships 2014, 2015; 3rd - 48 kg.
 Grand Prix Paris 2016; 3rd - 48 kg.
 European Championships U23; 3rd -  48 kg.
 2016 Olympics; 11th - 48 kg.
 2017 Ivan Yarygin GP 3rd - 48 kg.
 2017 Yasar Dogu International 48 kg.
 2018 U23 World Championship; 2nd - 53 kg.

References

1995 births
Living people
People from Izberbash
Kumyks
Russian female sport wrestlers
Wrestlers at the 2016 Summer Olympics
Olympic wrestlers of Russia
European Wrestling Championships medalists
Sportspeople from Dagestan
21st-century Russian women